Four leaves may refer to:
Four Leaves, Japanese boyband of the 1960s and 1970s
Quatrefoil, decorative element in heraldry and traditional Christian symbolism

See also
Four-leaf clover
Quartet distance, method of comparing two graph-theoretical trees based on groups of four leaves